The 1961–62 DDR-Oberliga season was the 14th season of the DDR-Oberliga, the top level of ice hockey in East Germany. Eight teams participated in the league, and SG Dynamo Weißwasser won the championship.

First round

Final round

Qualification round

References

External links
East German results 1949-1970

Ger
1961 in East German sport
1962 in East German sport
DDR-Oberliga (ice hockey) seasons
Ober